Rudolf Klein-Rhoden (27 January 1871 – 5 January 1936) was a German stage and film actor.

Selected filmography
 Madeleine (1919)
 Sins of the Parents (1919)
 Intoxication (1919)
 Prostitution (1919)
 Indische Nächte (1919)
 Hypnosis (1920)
 The Closed Chain (1920)
 Dancer of Death (1920)
 The Yellow Death (1920)
 The House of Torment (1921)
 Das gestohlene Millionenrezept (1921)
 The Amazon (1921)
 The Golden Plague (1921)
 The Black Spider (1921)
 Marie Antoinette, the Love of a King (1922)
 The Diadem of the Czarina (1922)
 The Moneylender's Daughter (1922)
 The Flight into Marriage (1922)
 The Romance of a Poor Sinner (1922)
 Rose of the Asphalt Streets (1922)
 Sunken Worlds (1922)
 Friedrich Schiller (1923)
 The Beautiful Girl (1923)
 Resurrection (1923)
 The Third Watch (1924)
 The Enchantress (1924)
 The Dice Game of Life (1925)
 The Man on the Comet (1925)
 Struggle for the Soil (1925)
 Harry Hill, Lord of the World (1925)
 The Circus Princess (1925)
 State Attorney Jordan (1926)
 At Ruedesheimer Castle There Is a Lime Tree (1928)
 A Love, A Thief, A Department Store (1928)
 Fight of the Tertia (1929)
 Roses Bloom on the Moorland (1929)

References
 Ludwig Eisenberg: Großes biographisches Lexikon der Deutschen Bühne im XIX. Jahrhundert. Verlag von Paul List, Leipzig 1903, S. 512 f., https://www.archive.org/stream/ludwigeisenberg00eiseuoft#page/512/mode/1up

External links

1871 births
1936 deaths
Actors from Brno
People from the Margraviate of Moravia
German male film actors
German male silent film actors
German male stage actors
20th-century German male actors
Moravian-German people